Eduard Wahl (March 29, 1903 – February 6, 1985) was a German politician of the Christian Democratic Union (CDU) and former member of the German Bundestag.

Life 
Wahl joined the CDU in 1945 and became chairman of the Heidelberg district association in 1950. In the election to the first German Bundestag in 1949, he was elected to parliament as a direct candidate in the Heidelberg constituency (later renamed Heidelberg City constituency). In the first legislative period he was a full member of the Committee for the Protection of the Rights of the People's Representation and for the Occupation Statute. He was also an alternate member of the Committee on Patent Law and Legal Protection. From March 1953, he was also a member of the Committee on Electoral Law and the Committee on Legal Affairs and Constitutional Law, of which he was also a member in the second legislative period. During the first four legislative periods, from 1949 to 1965, he was also an alternate member of the Electoral Examination Committee. In the second term he was chairman of the Committee on Consequences of Occupation; in the third and fourth terms he was a full member of the Committees on Verification of Credentials, Immunity and Rules of Procedure. In the 1965 Bundestag elections, Wahl was re-elected to the Bundestag and, as he had done since 1957, served on the Legal Affairs Committee. From 1968 until he left the Bundestag a year later, he was also chairman of the Committee on Economic Affairs and Development.

Literature

References

1903 births
1985 deaths
Members of the Bundestag for Baden-Württemberg
Members of the Bundestag 1965–1969
Members of the Bundestag 1961–1965
Members of the Bundestag 1957–1961
Members of the Bundestag 1953–1957
Members of the Bundestag 1949–1953
Members of the Bundestag for the Christian Democratic Union of Germany